Maria Carolina Gomes Santiago (born 2 August 1985) is a Brazilian Paralympic swimmer who competes in international level events. She competed at the 2020 Summer Paralympics and won five medals, including three gold medals.

Life 
Santiago has a congenital eye condition called morning glory syndrome which is a defect in her optic nerve, she is partially sighted in her left eye but doesn't have peripheral vision in her right eye. She began swimming aged four and took part in able-bodied swimming competitions and open water swimming aged twelve. By the age of seventeen, she was completely blind for eight months due to accumulation of water in her retina and stopped swimming. She went back to swimming a decade later aged 27 and started to swim competitively again and in 2019 at the Caixa Open, she broke the Brazilian national record in the 50m freestyle that was set by Fabiana Sugimori at the 2004 Summer Paralympics in Athens. During the 2020 Summer Paralympics, she was the gold medalist in the 50 m freestyle S13, the 100 m freestyle S12 and the 100 m breaststroke S12, becoming the first Brazilian female swimmer to win three gold medals in the same edition of the Games.

Achievements

References

External links
 

1985 births
Living people
Sportspeople from Recife
Swimmers from São Paulo
Paralympic swimmers of Brazil
Medalists at the World Para Swimming Championships
Medalists at the 2019 Parapan American Games
Swimmers at the 2020 Summer Paralympics
Medalists at the 2020 Summer Paralympics
Paralympic gold medalists for Brazil
Paralympic bronze medalists for Brazil
Paralympic medalists in swimming
Brazilian female freestyle swimmers
Brazilian female backstroke swimmers
Brazilian female breaststroke swimmers
S12-classified Paralympic swimmers
21st-century Brazilian women